"'Ni Loca" is a Latin pop song by Colombian recording artist Fanny Lu, written and produced by herself, Wise Cruz and Andrés Munera, for her third studio album Felicidad y Perpetua. The song was released worldwide on December 1, 2011 as the second single from the album. The music video of the song is available in the different video platforms from March 13, 2012.

Music video
On February 24, 2012 the singer published on her VEVO and YouTube channel the first teaser, while on March 6 of the same year released a second teaser where confirmed that the musical video will released on March 13. Finally the video was released that day. As of December 16, 2012, the video has reached 2.87 million views on YouTube.

Track listing
Digital download
 "Ni Loca (feat. Dalmata)" -

Charts

Weekly charts

Year-end charts

References

2011 singles
Spanish-language songs
Fanny Lu songs
Record Report Top 100 number-one singles
Record Report Top Latino number-one singles
Universal Music Latino singles
Songs written by Wise (composer)
Songs written by Fanny Lu
Songs written by Andrés Munera